Masefield is an unincorporated community within the Rural Municipality of Val Marie No. 17, Saskatchewan, Canada. The community is located on Highway 18, about 10 km southwest of Val Marie.

Etymology

Masefield was named after John Masefield, a contemporary English poet.

History

Masefield once contained a store, lumber yard, pool hall, cafe, and blacksmith shop, as well as a three-room schoolhouse and three grain elevators. Crop failures began in 1925, causing many residents to take out new farms at Hays, Alberta, where a new irrigation project was being installed. Although no business operates in the community today, its name survives in the nearby Masefield Pasture, which is co-operatively managed.

Demographics

In 2006, Masefield had a population of 0 living in 0 dwellings, a 0% increase from 2001.

See also

 List of communities in Saskatchewan

References

Val Marie No. 17, Saskatchewan
Unincorporated communities in Saskatchewan
Division No. 4, Saskatchewan